The Great British Bake Off: An Extra Slice (sometimes shortened to An Extra Slice) is a British television after-show to follow the series The Great British Bake Off. Hosted by Jo Brand, the show features three celebrity panelists discussing the after-events of the week. Originally, the show began airing on BBC Two on 8 August 2014 two days after the premiere episode of the fifth series of the main show, and was filmed at The London Studios. In April 2017, it was announced that the series and Brand would follow The Great British Bake Off to Channel 4 in 2017. The sixth series of The Great British Bake Off: An Extra Slice  returned on 30 August 2019 and concluded on 1 November 2019. The eighth series began airing on 24 September and concluded on 26 November 2021. In 2022 The Great British Bake Off: An Extra Slice has been renewed for a ninth series that started airing on 16 September 2022.

History
The after show was announced in July 2014. Comedian Jo Brand was later announced as the host of the series on 24 July 2014. The show returned for a second run, beginning on 7 August 2015, and for a third series on 24 August 2016. A fourth series began on 31 August 2017 on Channel 4. A fifth series began on 31 August 2018, moving to Friday evenings.

Format
Brand and three rotating panelists appear on each episode. The panelists are generally a chef or cooking expert, such as Michel Roux Jr. or Rosemary Shrager, a comedian such as Hal Cruttenden, and a well-known figure who is a fan of the show. The panel has also featured past bakers, including winners Nancy Birtwhistle and Nadiya Hussain. A typical episode begins with Brand reviewing the events of the previous episode while showing clips, including unseen footage from the tent, usually humorous outtakes. Afterwards, she interviews the panelists about the current episode and what happened in the tent that week. In the next segment, she presents images of bakes viewers have sent in, then talks about the bakes the audience have brought to the studio, at least one of which the panelists try. In the final segment, the most recently eliminated baker joins the panel and is interviewed again by Brand. The baker is invited to bring one of their "less-successful bakes" which Brand and the panel sample. The segment concludes with the baker being presented a cake that captures their time in the tent. Brand concludes the show by showing a preview of what will happen in the next episode of the main show.

Panelists
While on the BBC, the celebrity panel typically (though not always) consisted of a professional baker/chef, a celebrity who is a fan of the show, and a comedian. In the final episode of each series judges Paul Hollywood and Mary Berry normally made an appearance on the panel, along with a comedian.  However, since the fourth series (tied to the 8th series of the main show), Prue Leith and Hollywood have appeared on episodes throughout the series. In the Channel 4 version of the show, the panel consists of two comedians and an actor or other fan. In 2018, Tom Allen joined the series as a regular contributor, reviewing audience members' bakes. Sarah Millican hosted one edition of the second series in 2015, as regular host Jo Brand was unavailable.

Reception

Transmissions

References

External links
 

2014 British television series debuts
2010s British television series
2020s British television series
BBC Television shows
Channel 4 original programming
An Extra Slice
English-language television shows